Evenness may refer to:
Species evenness
evenness of numbers, for which see parity (mathematics)
evenness of zero, a special case of the above

See also
Even (disambiguation)